The dissolution of Gran Colombia refers to the disintegration of the political structures and the central government of said South American country, which culminated in the creation of three independent states: the Republic of Venezuela, the Republic of Ecuador and the Republic of New Granada.

The main ideological leader for the creation of Gran Colombia was the Liberator Simón Bolívar, who intended to create a nation strong enough to compete economically with the European powers and maintain its independence. It was the most ambitious dream of unity in Latin America.

Background 
Although Gran Colombia was created in 1819 with the union of New Granada (today Colombia), Venezuela, Ecuador and Panama in an attempt to unite various peoples from northern South America into a single nation, the new Republic was seen as by its constituent nations more as a resource to join forces against the viceregal power and prevent its reestablishment, than as the culmination of a process of social, economic and political identification of societies markedly unequal in their composition and in the degree of structuring of social power.

Before the union took place, some of the constituent countries had already tried various forms of government, mainly of the federalist type (United Provinces of New Granada and United Provinces of Venezuela); these tests and the confrontation with other groups that advocated a more centralized government or that were clearly pro-Spanish caused them to fail and be reconquered by the viceregal forces. Simón Bolívar concluded that a nation should be built with a solid unitary base, as he showed in his Letter from Jamaica.

After forming this Republic, the discrepancy of opinions between federalists and centralists, as well as the differences between each of the regions that made up the country and their own interests, accelerated the dispute over the form of government that Gran Colombia should have. As a form of concertation, he decided on the centralist system headed by Bolívar.

Quito and Panama had not had real representation in the constitutional deliberations, which took place in Villa del Rosario in 1821, because they formally became part of Gran Colombia in 1822. Despite there being support for the Constitution of 1821, more specifically in Guayaquil, Quito and Caracas, there were many supporters of a federalist constitution and one that would allow them to have regional control and freedom without strong central impositions; in particular, the Venezuelan military corps hoped to exert more power in its region; Likewise, it was not pleasant for the heroes and leaders of Panama, who were businessmen linked to transit and international traffic; Anglophiles for mercantile reasons, they professed Manchester liberalism and were, therefore, supporters of state abstentionism, free trade and an essentially commercial economy.

The union of the four nations had never been solid due to various differential factors such as uneven economic development and the lack of communication routes between the three regions of the country, for which cohesion was only maintained during the years of the war thanks to the prestige and the will of the Liberator. The members of the army had been given the right to vote from the Constitution of 1821 as fair recognition of the effort made in the liberation campaign. In 1827 Congress made a constitutional change to exclude sergeants and below so that only officers could vote.

La Cosiata 

As a result of the constant onslaught of royalist guerrillas and the prevailing fear of a supposed "Holy Alliance" between France and Spain to recover the American colonies, Francisco de Paula Santander decreed on August 31, 1824 a general enlistment of all citizens between 16 and 50 years old, demanding from the department of Venezuela a contingent of 50,000 men to be sent to Bogotá. General José Antonio Páez, who had been exercising the functions of General Commander of said department since 1822, delayed the execution of the decree for almost a year, fearful not only of a general mutiny, but also to demonstrate his displeasure with the decisions of the central government.

After a series of events, including several uprisings in Venezuela due to forced enlistment, the continuous pressure from Bogotá to abide by the decree and also the intervention of influential leaders, including Miguel Peña,  finally, José Antonio Páez declared himself in disobedience on April 30, 1826, assuming the government of Venezuela and committing himself not to obey orders from the Central Government of Bogotá. Bolívar, who had been re-elected President and upon learning of this situation, left Lima for Venezuela on September 4, arriving in Guayaquil on September 12 and Bogotá on November 16, then heading to Cartagena and from there by sea. , arriving in Puerto Cabello on December 31. Days later Bolívar met with Páez, reaffirming his liberating union and the Liberator grants him a general amnesty and ratifies José Antonio Páez Herrera as Civil and Military Chief of the department of Venezuela. However, the divisions between Venezuelans and New Granadans grew in view of the delay in the constitutional reforms requested by the citizens, intensifying in subsequent years.

Bolívar returned to Santafé at the beginning of 1827, encountering strong resistance in the political circles that were grouped around General Santander. The trust that the Liberator placed in his closest military collaborators, mostly Venezuelans and British, and their frequent excesses, added one more reason to the differences between Bolívar and the members of Congress. It was then thought of carrying out the constitutional reform that had been requested for some years before and the Congress convened a new Constituent Assembly. This assembly met on April 9, 1828 in Ocaña, made up of the representatives of the parishes to elect the Constituent Congress that would reform the Constitution of Cúcuta. The inevitable confrontation between Bolivarians and Santanderistas then took place: the Santanderistas (Federalists) achieved a large representation while the Bolivarians decided to abandon the deliberations, for which a quorum was not achieved. Three months later the convention was closed without results.

This inability to exercise democracy and to resolve conflicts through dialogue, negotiation and voting, opting rather for abandonment, was a behavior that haunted the traditional parties during the 19th and 20th centuries, and was the cause generator of violence. Despite everything, the members were appointed in the elections of July 1, 1828.

The Septembrine Conspiracy 

Bolívar, with his fervent desire to see a united Gran Colombia, requested greater powers as a last resort. On August 27, 1828, the Liberator assumed legislative powers and began a dictatorship. He abolished the Vice Presidency and Francisco de Paula Santander went into the opposition when he was removed from the government; he issued emergency economic decrees restoring abolished taxes and modifying the customs tariff in a protectionist sense; removed the teaching of Jeremy Bentham from education and dissolved Masonic organizations in an effort to appease belligerent opposition from the Catholic media. He also projected a constitution that he had developed that included Peru and Bolivia (since the latter had already separated from the Río de la Plata), with a strong central government and a presidency with dictatorial powers.

These measures created an atmosphere of tension, which finally set the Santanderistas on fire because they saw in that proposal a setback to the monarchy, Francisco de Paula Santander wrote to him, to express his disagreement with his position; "Furthermore, I have not fought fourteen years against Fernando VII to now have a king called Simón I". One faction reached the point of trying to assassinate the liberator on September 25 of the same year, a conspiracy in which a group of Granadan intellectuals participated, including the poet Luis Vargas Tejada, Florentino González, Mariano Ospina and Wenceslao Zulabair, accompanied by the Venezuelan military officer Pedro Carujo, Frenchman Agustín Horment and Portuguese adventurer Dr. Arganil, who entered the Palace of San Carlos, killed the soldiers of the guard and Bolívar's personal aide-de-camp. He, half-naked, protected by members of the servants and by Manuelita Sáenz, remained hidden for several hours under a bridge over the San Francisco River.

As a result of the Septembrine conspiracy, fourteen conspirators were put to death, among them Admiral José Prudencio Padilla, naval hero of the war of emancipation, Francisco de Paula Santander, who was attributed the intellectual authorship of the attack and who was also sentenced to death, but his sentence was commuted to exile. He went to Europe as a political exile, from where he returned to assume the Presidency of New Granada in 1833, once the dissolution of Gran Colombia had been completed.

War with Peru and death of the Liberator 

Bolívar, seeing the presence of several aggressions by the Peruvians (which led to the Gran Colombo-Peruvian war), marched south and left the Council of Ministers chaired by Domingo Caicedo in power. The Congress, meeting at the end of 1828, appointed General Antonio José de Sucre as interim president over the merits that General Urdaneta had for the position. On June 4, 1830 Sucre was assassinated in the jungles of Berruecos, being the premature end of the hero, considered the political heir of the Liberator. This fact caused great confusion, especially in politics. The project of the constitution for Gran Colombia was also left without great defenders. Caicedo asked Congress not to issue it without first making sure of its acceptance in Venezuela. However, it was sanctioned by Caicedo on May 15 (without consultation in Caracas), three days after it was issued. The constitution began the insubordinations and agitations: battalions began due to ignorance of Bolívar's mandate over them, the municipal councils of Pasto and Buenaventura, as well as that of Cauca, asked to be annexed by Ecuador. Cúcuta, Casanare and Pamplona also requested to be annexed but to Venezuelan territory. Criticism from the inhabitants of Peru abounded by refusing to be part of the dictatorship. Bolívar then resigned the presidency on May 4, 1830, leaving Domingo Caicedo as interim president. The next day, May 5, the Admirable Congress approved a new Constitution that maintained the unity of Gran Colombia but never entered into force.

Military discontent and liberal groups led to a confrontation in the Funza savannah between them and the government on August 27, 1830, which led to the dictatorship of General Rafael Urdaneta and the overthrow of Joaquín Mosquera. Finally, after being exiled from Venezuela and seeing that his dream of a united America fell into disgrace, on December 17, 1830, the Liberator Simón Bolívar died.

Separation of Venezuela 
After several years of attempts to reconcile the positions of the federalists and centralists, the separation of Venezuela began to materialize in 1826 with the La Cosiata movement of José Antonio Páez. Bolívar, seeing an imminent separation of that region from Gran Colombia, called a constituent assembly on March 20, 1830 in order to reconcile the different factions that were created in the Republic and avoid dissolution. This was called the Admirable Congress after the group of eminent persons who attended; Despite reconciling the various ideologies in a certain way, it was not possible to achieve the union of the regions around the command of Bogotá.

Before the Congress was held, in the cities of Valencia and Caracas, on November 23 and 25, 1829, popular assemblies were held to express their opinion on the form of government that the republic should have, the type of constitution and the form election of the president of the nation. Said assemblies agreed on the definitive separation of Venezuela from the government of Bogotá and disregard of Bolívar's authority. A constituent congress was then called and installed in Valencia on May 6, 1830, which was characterized by its anti-Bolivarian tendency; This congress of deputies confirmed José Antonio Páez as president of Venezuela. This declared the total autonomy of Venezuela and promulgated the election regulations for the meeting of the constituent congress.

On September 22, the Congress of Valencia sanctioned the new Constitution, with which the separation of Venezuela from Gran Colombia was definitively consummated. The Liberator, sick and dying, passes from Cartagena to Soledad and from there to Barranquilla. On December 1, he arrived by sea at Santa Marta, on the 6th he was taken to the Quinta San Pedro Alejandrino, where he died on December 17 at the age of 47.

Separation of Ecuador 
In Quito, knowing that Venezuela had separated and that Bolívar was withdrawing definitively, they made the decision to separate. With this, Gran Colombia vanished after 11 years of existence.

On May 13, 1830, the Southern District declared its independence from Colombia, forming the State of Ecuador. That day an Assembly of Notables met in Quito in order to resolve the separation of this region from Gran Colombia and form an independent State, although initially federated. From it emerged General Juan José Flores, originally from Venezuela, as Supreme Head of the Government.

The Quito Assembly arranged for Flores to manage the integration of the other southern departments in consideration of the fact that the governors are military under his command; This is how on May 19 and 20, the Departments of Guayaquil and Azuay separated from Colombia and decided to form the new State. For August 14, Flores called a Constituent Assembly in the city of Riobamba to issue the Political Constitution of Ecuador; said assembly was made up of his supporters who named him Provisional President.

On September 22, 1830, the first Ecuadorian constitution was promulgated, which declared, among other articles, that the departments of Azuay, Guayaquil and Quito were reunited with each other, forming a single independent body with the name of the State of Ecuador. Juan José Flores assumed power as President of the new State and José Joaquín de Olmedo as Vice President.

With the definitive disappearance, in 1831, of Gran Colombia, Ecuador proclaimed itself a Republic from the Constitution of 1835.

Separations of Panama 

After these dismemberments, Gran Colombia was made up only of the central region, which at that time included the old departments of Boyacá, Cauca, Cundinamarca, Magdalena and Isthmus.

On September 26, 1830, the Department of the Isthmus (Panama) also separated from the Gran Colombian State. Its manager was the Panamanian general José Domingo Espinar, a mulatto of popular origin who did not share the preferences of the Panamanian oligarchy and a great supporter of Bolívar, whose secretary he had been. Due to the crisis caused by the resignation of the liberator and the dismemberment of Gran Colombia, Espinar, supported by the masses of the capital's suburbs, rebelled against the prevailing government, waiting for Bolívar's return to power.

In consequence of what was proclaimed, a Panamanian delegation went to Barranquilla, where Bolívar was located, to invite him to the Isthmus to resume power and rebuild the dismembered Gran Colombia. Bolívar refused such an offer and advised his former secretary to reincorporate the Isthmus into Colombia. This is how José Domingo Espinar proceeded, although soon another secessionist movement would take place.

The second separation was conceived by the Venezuelan Colonel Juan Eligio Alzuru on July 9, 1831, who initially had the approval of the Panamanian oligarchy, both in the capital and in the interior. However, the methods used by Alzuru were cruel and arbitrary, endangering the interests of the Panamanian ruling class. To appease this movement and return order to the isthmus, the government of New Granada entrusted General Tomás Herrera to confront Alzuru and reincorporate the provinces under his mandate into the Republic, investing him with the rank of "Commander General of the Isthmus." Herrera managed to capture Alzuru and shot him on August 29. Once Herrera was victorious, he was entrusted with the organization of said territory.

Consequences 

From 1830 in the middle of the separations of Ecuador (1830), Panama (1830 and 1831) and Venezuela (1830); the disintegration of the government of Gran Colombia and its political structures was precipitated. Being born as a consequence the State of Ecuador and the State of Venezuela; while Panama remained under dictatorial military governments that failed to organize the basic institutions of a State.

Through the Apulo Agreement (carried out on April 28, 1831), General Rafael Urdaneta, the last president of Gran Colombia, handed over command to Domingo Caicedo (May 3). He presided over it until November 21, when it was legally abolished.

On May 7, a convention was convened in the central departments of the late Gran Colombia, in which representatives from Cundinamarca, Cauca, Antioquia, Isthmus (Panama), Magdalena and Boyacá were to gather. They were to meet in Bogotá on October 15. Panama joined the initiative after the fall of the dictatorial regime at the end of August 1831.

The objective of this convention was to agree on a constitution for the central departments of the late Gran Colombia and elect the magistrates who should govern it.

In the convention finally held on October 20, 1831, the State of New Granada was created, which with the Constitution of 1832 would be officially called the Republic of New Granada.

References

External links 

 See copy of the Acts of Separation of Panama from Gran Colombia (1830 and 1831), P. 173-170.

Gran Colombia
1820s in South America
1830s in South America
Dissolutions of countries